Jalan Sungai Terap–Simpang Jeram (Johor state route J135) is a major road in Johor, Malaysia.

List of junctions

Roads in Johor